Modrá Hůrka is a municipality and village in České Budějovice District in the South Bohemian Region of the Czech Republic. It has about 100 inhabitants.

Administrative parts
The village of Pořežánky is an administrative part of Modrá Hůrka.

Notable people
Eleonora Ehrenbergová (1832–1912), operatic soprano

References

Villages in České Budějovice District